Eugène Jacob de Cordemoy (1835 in Saint-André, Réunion – 25 April 1911 in Hellbourg, Salazie, Réunion) was French physician and botanist.

He had a particular interest in orchids, continuing the work of Charles Frappier. He is the author of  Flore de l'île de la Réunion (English: Flora of the island of Réunion) published in 1895.  He also studied birds.

Bibliography 
 Rapport sur la maladie de la canne à sucre; lu à la Chambre d'agriculture à sa session de juin 1868, Saint-Denis; G. Lahuppe, 1868.
 Rapport de la commission chargée d'étudier la catastrophe du Grand-Sablé, à Salazie, (Rapporteur : Dr Jacob de Cordemoy) Saint-Denis (Réunion) : impr. de G. Lahuppe, 1876.
 Flore de l'Île de la Réunion. Fascicule I, Cryptogames vasculaires, (fougeres, lycopodes, sélaginelles), Saint-Denis, Réunion : Typographie de la Vérité, 1891.
 Flore de l'île de la Réunion (phanérogames, cryptogames, vasculaires, muscinées) avec l'indication des propriétés économiques & industrielles des plantes, Paris, P. Klinsksieck, 1895.

References

1835 births
1911 deaths
19th-century French botanists
Orchidologists
Botanists active in Africa
Flora of Réunion
People from Réunion